Maida Markgraf (born 13 March 1991) is a Montenegrin footballer.

Career
Mujović started her career with ESV Merseburg, and later played for Sporting Mücheln, along with her sister Ilda. In the summer of 2007, Mujović transferred to German Regionalliga team Magdeburger FFC, where she again played with her sister. In the summer of 2012, Markgraf signed for SVE Bad Dürrenberg, where she once again played with her sister.

International career

In May 2012, Markgraf made her debut for Montenegro in a friendly against Albania.

Family
Markgraf's sister Ilda Mujović has also played for the Montenegrin national team. Markgraf married in early 2012.

References

1993 births
Living people
Women's association football defenders
People from Bijelo Polje
Montenegrin women's footballers
Montenegro women's international footballers